Sarah Richardson (born October 22, 1971) is a Canadian interior designer and television personality who started out her career as a prop stylist in 1994. Since then, she has hosted several television series on design for HGTV in Canada. Sarah Richardson is the recipient of a Gemini Award  as well as a Canada's Top 40 Under 40  award.

Early life and education
Richardson was born on October 22, 1971 in Toronto, Ontario.  Her mother, Susan Cuddy, was director of design and development for the old City of Toronto.  Her father, Douglas Richardson, is a retired professor of history of art and architecture at the University of Toronto. Her brother, Theo Richardson, is also a designer and is a partner in the New York City firm of Rich, Brilliant, Willing. Richardson's parents divorced when she was five.

Richardson attended high school in Toronto at Havergal College. In 1993, she received a B.A. in Visual Arts (a combination of Art History and Studio Arts) from the University of Western Ontario where she was in the Gamma Phi Beta sorority.

Career

Sarah Richardson runs the interior design firm Sarah Richardson Design, which she founded in 1998.

Television series hosted by or starring Sarah Richardson include:
Design Inc.
Room Service
Sarah's House
Sarah's Cottage
Sarah 101
Real Potential
Sarah's Cottage Rental
Sarah Off the Grid
Sarah's Mountain Escape

She has published several best-selling interior design books, and also runs her eponymous YouTube channel with over one hundred thousand subscribers.

Personal life
Richardson is married to Alexander Younger. The couple live in Toronto with their two daughters Robin (born March 2006) and Fiona (born August 2008). Richardson and Younger also own a summer house on Georgian Bay in Ontario, which Richardson decorated and featured in the Canadian television series Sarah's Cottage, which was also broadcast in the United States under the title Sarah's Summer House. The summer house is powered by solar energy and propane. Both of her daughters are ski-racers.

References

External links
 Sarah Richardson Design
 
 

1971 births
Canadian interior designers
Canadian television hosts
Canadian women television hosts
Living people
People from Toronto
University of Western Ontario alumni
Havergal College alumni
Academic staff of the University of Toronto